Əlisoltanlı (also, Alisoltanly) is a village and municipality in the Saatly Rayon of Azerbaijan.  It has a population of 1,501.

References 

Populated places in Saatly District